is a village located in Nagano Prefecture, Japan. , the village had an estimated population of 2924 in 1091 households, and a population density of 22 persons per km².

Geography
Minamimaki is located in mountainous eastern Nagano Prefecture at an average altitude of between 1000 and 1500 meters, bordered by Yamanashi Prefecture to the south. The Southern Yatsugatake Volcanic Group is partly located within this village.

Surrounding municipalities
 Nagano Prefecture
Chino
 Koumi
 Kawakami
 Kitaaiki
 Yamanashi Prefecture
 Hokuto

Climate
The village has a humid continental climate characterized by warm and humid summers, and cold winters with heavy snowfall (Köppen climate classification Dfb).

History
The area of present-day Minamimaki was part of ancient Shinano Province. The modern village of Minamimaki was created with the establishment of the municipalities system on April 1, 1889.

Demographics
Per Japanese census data, the population of Minamimaki has remained relatively steady over the past 50 years.

Politics and Government

Elections 
 2007 Minamimaki mayoral election

Transportation

Railway
 East Japan Railway Company - Koumi Line
  - <  > -   -

Highway

Local attractions
Nobeyama radio observatory
Yadegawa ruins, a Japanese Paleolithic period trace and National Historic Site

References

External links

Official Website 

 
Villages in Nagano Prefecture